In microeconomics, isovalue lines define a relationship between the production of two products in which the total market value is constant. 

For example: In a market that produces bread and wine, the market is willing to trade one bottle of wine for three breads. If this relationship is constant, we would have an isovalue line (in a graph with bread as x and wine as y) that sloped less than 45° downward. The exact slope could be derived from wine/bread, in this case -1/3.

Microeconomics